Privolny (masculine), Privolnaya (feminine), or Privolnoye (neuter) may refer to:
Privolnoye, Armenia, a town in Armenia
Privolnoye, Azerbaijan, a village in Azerbaijan
Privolny, Russia, several rural localities in Russia